Asteroid homolog 1 (Drosophila) is a protein that in humans is encoded by the ASTE1 gene. The gene is also known as HT001.

Model organisms

Model organisms have been used in the study of ASTE1 function. A conditional knockout mouse line, called Aste1tm1a(KOMP)Wtsi was generated as part of the International Knockout Mouse Consortium program — a high-throughput mutagenesis project to generate and distribute animal models of disease to interested scientists.

Male and female animals underwent a standardized phenotypic screen to determine the effects of deletion. Twenty four tests were carried out on homozygous mutant mice and one significant abnormality was observed: females had an increased susceptibility to bacterial infection.

References

Further reading 
 

Human proteins
Genes mutated in mice